In sports, health and particularly exercise testing, the rating of perceived exertion (RPE), as measured by the Borg rating of perceived exertion scale (RPE scale), is a frequently used quantitative measure of perceived exertion during physical activity. In medicine this is used to document the patient's exertion during a test for the severity of diseases, and sports coaches use the scale to assess the intensity of training and competition as well as endurance. The original scale introduced by Gunnar Borg rated exertion on a scale of 6-20. Borg then constructed a newer category (C) ratio (R) scale, the Borg CR10 scale, rated on a scale from 1-10. This is especially used in clinical diagnosis and severity assessment of breathlessness and dyspnea, chest pain, angina and musculo-skeletal pain. The CR-10 scale is best suited when there is an overriding sensation arising either from a specific area of the body rather than overall exertion, for example, muscle pain, ache or fatigue in the quadriceps or from pulmonary responses during exertion.

The Borg scale can be compared to other linear scales such as the Likert scale or a visual analogue scale. The sensitivity and reproducibility of the results are broadly very similar, although the Borg may outperform the Likert scale in some cases.

Set points on the RPE scale
The Borg RPE scale is a numerical scale that ranges from 6 to 20, where 6 means "no exertion at all" and 20 means "maximal exertion." When a measurement is taken, a number is chosen from the following scale by an individual that best describes their perceived level of exertion during physical activity.

6 – no exertion at all, relaxed
7 – extremely light
8
9 – very light
10
11 – light
12 – moderate
13 – somewhat hard
14
15 – hard 
16
17 – very hard
18
19 – extremely hard
20 – maximal exertion

The scale was constructed to roughly correlate to 10% of heart rate in a healthy 20-year-old. In older individuals, the correlation becomes higher than 10% at the high-end of the scale, as maximum heart rate declines with age.

See also
 metabolic equivalent of task

References

External links
Information about Gunnar Borg PhD MD hc. at Department of Psychology, Stockholm University
 More detailed description of the Borg scale at the U.S. Centers for Disease Control and Prevention

Physical exercise
Sports science
Scales